Kollie is a Liberian surname. Notable people with the name include:
 Amos Kollie (born 1990), Liberian footballer 
 Perry Kollie (born 1982), Liberian footballer 
 Prince Kollie (born 2003), American football linebacker

References 

Surnames of Liberian origin